Concerto in True Minor is the debut studio release of the metal/classical combining project True Symphonic Rockestra.

History
The project began several years ago but was finally released on March 28, 2008.

Track listing
"Nessun Dorma" - 3:05
"My Way" - 1:36
"Moon River" - 1:22
"Singin' in the Rain" - 1:31
"Granada" - 3:10
"Tu, Ca Nun Chiagne" - 3:47
"Ochi Tchorniye" - 0:16 (instrumental)
"Memories" - 1:29
"Cielito Lindo" - 1:35
"Tonight" - 1:04
"Libiamo Ne' Lieti Calici" - 3:15
"La Donna E Mobile" - 1:48
"Non Ti Scordar Di Me" - 3:51
"'O Sole Mio" - 2:42
"Dein ist mein ganzes Herz" - 2:24
"With a Song in My Heart" - 2:39
"Dorogoi Dlinnoyu" - 3:16
"America" - 1:09
"Funiculì, Funiculà" - 1:59
"Brazil" - 1:29
"Pourquoi Me Reveiller" - 3:05

Credits

Vocals
James LaBrie - Rock Tenor
Vladimir Grishko - Opera Tenor
Thomas Dewald - Opera Tenor

Musicians
Dirk Ulrich - Guitar
Christopher Jesidero - Violin
Sandro Martinez - Guitar
Paul Mayland - drums
Marvin Philippi - Bass

2008 albums